Couples therapy is counseling aimed at improving romantic relationships and resolving interpersonal conflicts.

Couples therapy may also refer to:
 Couples Therapy (2012 TV series), an American reality television show on VH1
 Couples Therapy (2019 TV series), an American television show on Showtime